Alexander Alexandrovich Kazakov (Kozakov, Kosakoff) (2 January 1889 – 1 August 1919) (British Distinguished Service Order and Military Cross and the French Légion d'honneur) was the most successful Russian flying ace and fighter pilot during the First World War.

Pre World War I

Born to a Russian noble family in Kherson Governorate, Kazakov graduated from Yelizavetgrad cavalry school in 1908. He did his stint in cavalry, but in 1913 he began formal training as a pilot and graduated at the beginning of World War I from Gatchina military aviation school.

World War I
Alexander Kazakov flew on Morane-Saulnier, Spad – SА2, Nieuport 11 and Nieuport 17 planes and is alleged to have the largest number of victories over enemy aircraft among Imperial Russian Air Force pilots. Unofficially he shot down 32 German and Austro-Hungarian planes, although his official tally is only 20 because only planes crashed in Russian-held territory were counted. Russian military aviation tradition during World War I was different from that of its Western allies and rivals and the individual scores of pilots were considered to be of lesser value compared to their contribution to the overall war effort.

On 31 March 1915 Alexander Kazakov successfully repeated the aerial ramming attack first attempted by Pyotr Nesterov, using a Morane-Saulnier G as his piloted projectile. For this bit of daring, he was awarded the Order of Saint Anne, first in the Fourth Class, then in the Third. He was appointed to command of 19th Corps Fighter Detachment in September 1915. Here he had Nieuport 10s and Nieuport 11s to fly. Between 27 June and 21 December 1916, he racked up four more victories to become an ace.

Five months later, Kazakov resumed his winning streak with his sixth victory on 6 May 1917, which was shared with Ernst Leman and Pavel Argeyev. By 25 May, with his eighth win, he switched to a Nieuport 17, which he used henceforth.
Between 1915 and 1917 he fought on the Russian front as well as in Romania and participated in the Brusilov Offensive as a commander of 1st Combat Air Group.

In January 1918, in the wake of the Bolshevik Revolution, Kazakov resigned his Russian commission.

Russian Civil War
During the Russian Civil War Kazakov joined the Slavo-British Allied Legion in Arkhangelsk and fought against the Workers' and Peasants' Red Air Fleet.

On 1 August 1918 Kazakov became a major in the Royal Air Force and was appointed to be commanding officer in charge of an aviation squadron of the Slavo-British Allied Legion made up of Sopwith Camel planes.
After the British withdrawal from Russia which left the Russian White Army in a desperate situation, Kazakov died in a plane crash during an air show on 1 August 1919 which was performed to boost the morale of the Russian anti-Bolshevik troops. Most witnesses of the incident, including British ace Ira Jones, thought Kazakov committed suicide.

Honours and awards
 Order of St. George, 4th class (31 July 1917, Russian Empire)
 Order of St. Vladimir, 4th class (7 September 1916, Russian Empire)
 Order of St. Anne, 2nd, 3rd and 4th classes (respectively, 27 April 1917, 4 February 1915, 27 January 1916; Russian Empire)
 Order of St. Stanislaus, 2nd and 3rd classes (4 July 1916, 18 August 1913, Russian Empire)
 Gold Sword for Bravery (28 July 1915)
 Distinguished Service Order (UK, 1918)
 Military Cross (UK, 1919)
 Distinguished Flying Cross (United Kingdom, 20 March 1919)
 Chevalier of the Legion of Honour (France)
 Croix de guerre (France)

Citations

References
 Franks, Norman (2000). Nieuport Aces of World War I. Norman Franks. Osprey Publishing. , .
 Kulikov, Victor (2013) Russian Aces of World War 1. Osprey Publishing

External links
The Aerodrome Aleksandr Kozakov - in English
Military History of Russia - Kazakov Aleksandr - in Russian.
Personal file, victory list, color schemes - in Russian.
Russian WWI aces - in English and Russian

1889 births
1919 deaths
People from Kherson Governorate
Russian untitled nobility
Russian aviators
Aerial warfare pioneers
Aviators killed in aviation accidents or incidents
Russian military personnel of World War I
Recipients of the Order of St. Anna, 2nd class
Recipients of the Order of St. Vladimir, 4th class
Companions of the Distinguished Service Order
Recipients of the Gold Sword for Bravery
Recipients of the Military Cross
Recipients of the Distinguished Flying Cross (United Kingdom)
Chevaliers of the Légion d'honneur
Recipients of the Croix de Guerre 1914–1918 (France)
Imperial Russian Air Force personnel
Royal Air Force officers
Russian World War I flying aces
Russian people of Ukrainian descent
Pilots who performed an aerial ramming
Victims of aviation accidents or incidents in 1919
Victims of aviation accidents or incidents in the Soviet Union